Marie Hanitra Roilya Ranaivosoa (born 14 November 1990), commonly known as Roilya Ranaivosoa, is a Mauritian weightlifter of Malagasy descent, competing in the 48 kg category and representing Mauritius at international competitions.

She competed at several editions of the World Weightlifting Championships. She participated at the 2014 Commonwealth Games in the 58 kg event.

She represented Mauritius at the 2020 Summer Olympics in Tokyo, Japan. She finished in 11th place in the women's 49 kg event.

She won the silver medal in the women's 49 kg event at the 2022 Commonwealth Games held in Birmingham, England. In December 2022, she was elected as member of the IWF Athletes' Commission.

Major results

* Originally she was second place in snatch and total, but later the originally gold medallist Nigerian Elizabeth Onuah was disqualified.

References

External links
 
http://www.the-sports.org/marie-hanitra-roilya-ranaivosoa-weightlifting-spf367732.html
http://www.zimbio.com/photos/Roilya+Ranaivosoa/Weightlifting+Olympics+Day+1/FyljYRTZl22
http://www.lemauricien.com/topics/Roilya%20Ranaivosoa
https://www.youtube.com/watch?v=_sh4B_4S7fw
 
 

1990 births
Living people
People from Plaines Wilhems District
Mauritian female weightlifters
Weightlifters at the 2016 Summer Olympics
Weightlifters at the 2020 Summer Olympics
Olympic weightlifters of Mauritius
Weightlifters at the 2014 Commonwealth Games
Weightlifters at the 2018 Commonwealth Games
Weightlifters at the 2022 Commonwealth Games
Commonwealth Games silver medallists for Mauritius
Commonwealth Games medallists in weightlifting
African Games silver medalists for Mauritius
African Games medalists in weightlifting
Competitors at the 2015 African Games
Competitors at the 2019 African Games
African Games gold medalists for Mauritius
Medallists at the 2018 Commonwealth Games
Medallists at the 2022 Commonwealth Games